Kayel Locke (born August 18, 1994) is an American professional basketball player who last played for Belfius Mons-Hainaut of the BNXT League.

College career
Locke played college basketball for UNC Greensboro, where he averaged 12.6 points and 5.7 rebounds per game as a junior. He finished his senior season second on the team in scoring and rebounding with 12.6 points and 5.4 rebounds per game. Locke was first in program  history in games played with 130, sixth in scoring with 1,522 points and also sixth in rebounding with 652 career rebounds.

Professional career
Locke signed his first professional contract in September 2016, signing with Bashkimi of the Balkan league. He also played for teams in Latvia, Finland, Estonia and the Netherlands. In October 2019 he signed with Rain or Shine Elasto Painters. In November 2019, Locke signed with FC Porto in Portugal.

On September 2, 2020, Locke returned to Landstede Hammers for a second stint. In summer 2021, he joined Abejas de León of the Liga Nacional de Baloncesto Profesional and averaged 8.9 points and 4.4 rebounds per game. On December 14, 2021, Locke signed with Belfius Mons-Hainaut of the BNXT League. He parted ways with the team on January 6, 2022.

Personal life
Locke is the son of Vanessa and Kyle Locke, both of whom played college basketball at Coppin State. His brother Noah played basketball at Florida before transferring to Louisville. His sister Paris plays for the McDonogh School team.

References

External links
UNC Greensboro Spartans bio

1994 births
Living people
American expatriate basketball people in Estonia
American expatriate basketball people in Finland
American expatriate basketball people in Kosovo
American expatriate basketball people in Mexico
American expatriate basketball people in the Netherlands
American expatriate basketball people in the Philippines
American men's basketball players
Bashkimi Prizren players
Basketball players from Baltimore
BC Tallinn Kalev players
FC Porto basketball players
Helsinki Seagulls players
Landstede Hammers players
Rain or Shine Elasto Painters players
Abejas de León players
Small forwards
UNC Greensboro Spartans men's basketball players
Philippine Basketball Association imports